The International Criminal Tribunal for Rwanda (ICTR;) was an international court established in November 1994 by the United Nations Security Council in Resolution 955 in order to judge people responsible for the Rwandan genocide and other serious violations of international law in Rwanda, or by Rwandan citizens in nearby states, between 1 January and 31 December 1994.  The court eventually convicted 61 individuals at a cost of $1.3 billion.

In 1995, it became located in Arusha, Tanzania, under Resolution 977. From 2006, Arusha also became the location of the African Court on Human and Peoples' Rights. In 1998 the operation of the tribunal was expanded in Resolution 1165. Through several resolutions, the Security Council called on the tribunal to complete its investigations by end of 2004, complete all trial activities by end of 2008, and complete all work in 2012. The tribunal had jurisdiction over genocide, crimes against humanity, and violations of Common Article Three and Additional Protocol II of the Geneva Conventions (which deals with internal conflicts).

As of 2009, the tribunal had finished 50 trials and convicted 29 accused persons, and another 11 trials were in progress and 14 individuals were awaiting trial in detention; but the prosecutor intended to transfer 5 to national jurisdiction for trial. 13 others were still at large, some suspected to be dead. The first trial, of Jean-Paul Akayesu, began in 1997. Jean Kambanda, interim Prime Minister, pleaded guilty. According to the ICTR's Completion Strategy, in accordance with Security Council Resolution 1503, all first-instance cases were to have completed trial by the end of 2008 (this date was later extended to the end of 2009) and all work was to be completed by 2010. The United Nations Security Council called upon the tribunal to finish its work by 31 December 2014 to prepare for its closure and transfer of its responsibilities to the International Residual Mechanism for Criminal Tribunals (IRMCT or Mechanism) which had begun functioning for the ICTR branch on 1 July 2012. The Tribunal was officially closed on 31 December 2016.

The tribunal's failure to prosecute war crimes committed by the Rwandan Patriotic Front or try RPF leader Paul Kagame was widely criticized, to the point of being characterized as "victor's justice".

The Rwandan genocide
The Rwandan genocide refers to the mass slaughter of more than 800,000 ethnic Tutsi and politically moderate Hutu by government-directed gangs of Hutu extremist soldiers and police in Rwanda. The duration of the 1994 genocide is usually described as 100 days, beginning on April 6 and ending in mid-July.

The tension between the majority Hutu and the minority Tutsi had developed over time but was particularly emphasized late in the nineteenth century and early in the twentieth century as a result of German and Belgian colonialism over Rwanda. The ethnic categorization of the two was an imposed and an arbitrary construct based more on physical characteristics than ethnic background. However, the social differences between the Hutu and the Tusi have traditionally allowed the Tutsi, with a strong pastoralist tradition, to gain social, economic, and political ascendancy over the Hutu, who were primarily agriculturalists. The distinction under colonial powers allowed Tutsis to establish ruling power until a Hutu revolution in 1959 abolished the Tutsi monarchy by 1961. 

The hostility between the two groups continued, as "additional rounds of ethnic tension and violence flared periodically and led to mass killings of Tutsi in Rwanda, such as in 1963, 1967, and 1973". The establishment of the Rwandan Patriotic Front (RPF) and its invasion from Uganda furthered ethnic hatred. A ceasefire in these hostilities led to negotiations between the government and the RPF in 1992.

On April 6, 1994, a plane carrying then-President Juvenal Habyarimana, and Cyprien Ntaryamira of Burundi was shot down, killing everyone on board. The Hutu held the RPF accountable and immediately began the genocide, targeted at both Tutsis and Hutu moderates.

Most of the killing during the Rwandan genocide was carried out by the radical Hutu groups known as the Interahamwe and the Impuzamugambi. Radio broadcasts also were an integral part of the genocide, which further fueled the genocide by encouraging Hutu civilians to kill their Tutsi neighbours, labeled as "cockroaches" in need of extermination. Despite its colossal scale, particularly within such a short period of time, the genocide was carried out almost entirely by hand, usually with the utilization of machetes and clubs. Various atrocities committed include the rape of thousands of Tutsi women, as well as the dismemberment and disfigurement of victims. Frequently the killers were people the victims knew personally—neighbors, workmates, former friends, sometimes even relatives through marriage. At least 500,000 Tutsis were killed, and approximately 2 million refugees (mostly Hutus) left for refugee camps of neighboring Burundi, Tanzania, Uganda, and former Zaire.

Establishment of the ICTR
The United Nations Assistance Mission for Rwanda is regarded as a major failure. The international response to the Rwandan genocide was poor. For weeks, the major power nations denied that a genocide was taking place in Rwanda. The United States refused to call the incident genocide because using the term would make an obligation for the United States to send troops, which it was reluctant to do after several of its soldiers were killed during a humanitarian mission in Somalia the previous year. Finally in July 1994, after the genocide was over, the UN Security Council called for an investigation of the events, and acted to establish an international criminal tribunal to prosecute those individuals most responsible for the genocide. Adopting Resolution 955, the Security Council created the ICTR on 8 November 1994 and the ICTR would also deal with other crimes against international humanitarian law committed on the territory of Rwanda and neighboring states between 1 January 1994 and 31 December 1994.

ICTR structure 

The tribunal consisted of 16 judges in four "chambers" – three to hear trials, and one to hear appeals. In addition, there were 9 ad litem judges, making 25 in all. All 9 ad litem judges were assigned to Chambers II and III. There was an additional pool of 9 further ad literim judges who would be called on in the case of a judge being absent.

The column denoted by # indicates the order of precedence.

Trial Chamber I

Trial Chamber II

Trial Chamber III

Appeals Chamber

Office of the Prosecutor

The Office of the Prosecutor was divided into various units at the height of its activity, including the Investigations Division and the Prosecution Division:
 The Prosecution Division was responsible for prosecuting all cases before the Tribunal. Headed by a Chief of Prosecutions.
 The Investigations Division was responsible for collecting evidence implicating individuals in crimes committed in Rwanda in 1994. Headed by a Chief of Investigations.

Prosecutors

 Richard Goldstone, late 1994 to 30 September 1996 (by virtue of Resolution 936)
 Louise Arbour, 1 October 1996 to 15 September 1999 (Resolution 1047)
 Carla Del Ponte, 15 September 1999 to 14 September 2003 (Resolution 1259)
 Hassan Bubacar Jallow, 15 September 2003 to 31 December 2015 (Resolution 1505)

The Registry
The Registry was responsible for the overall administration and management of the ICTR. It also performed other legal functions assigned to it by the Tribunal’s Rules of Procedure and Evidence, and was the Tribunal’s channel of communication.

The Registry was headed by the Registrar, who was the Representative of the UN Secretary-General. Bongani Christopher Majola of South Africa was Registrar. after January 2013.

The Case of Jean-Paul Akayesu

After an intense and precisely targeted campaign of a number of international non-governmental organizations, which aimed at raising awareness of gendered violence at the ICTR, the trial of Jean-Paul Akayesu established the legal precedent that genocidal rape falls within the act of genocide. "...the [Trial] Chamber finds that in most cases, the rapes of Tutsi women in Taba, were accompanied with the intent to kill those women. ... In this respect, it appears clearly to the chamber that the acts of rape and sexual violence, as other acts of serious bodily and mental harm committed against the Tutsi, reflected the determination to make Tutsi women suffer and to mutilate them even before killing them, the intent being to destroy the Tutsi group while inflicting acute suffering on its members in the process." Presiding judge Navanethem Pillay said in a statement after the verdict: "From time immemorial, rape has been regarded as spoils of war. Now it will be considered a war crime. We want to send out a strong message that rape is no longer a trophy of war."

Media Case

The trial against "hate media" began on 23 October 2000. It was charged with the prosecution of the media which encouraged the genocide of 1994. The prosecutor was Gregory Gordon.

On 19 August 2003, at the tribunal in Arusha, life sentences were requested for Ferdinand Nahimana, and Jean-Bosco Barayagwiza, persons in charge for the Radio Télévision Libre des Mille Collines, as well as Hassan Ngeze, director and editor of the Kangura newspaper. They were charged with genocide, incitement to genocide, and crimes against humanity, before and during the period of the genocides of 1994. On 3 December 2003, the court found all three defendants guilty and sentenced Nahimana and Ngeze to life imprisonment and Barayagwiza to imprisonment for 35 years. On 28 November 2007, the Appeals Chamber partially allowed appeals against conviction from all three men, reducing their sentences to 30 years' imprisonment for Nahimana, 32 years' imprisonment for Barayagwiza and 35 years' imprisonment for Ngeze.

No prosecutions have been brought against the founders, sponsors or anyone related to Radio Muhabura, a media whose pro-RPF messages were broadcast throughout the country during the 1990–1994 war.

Related legal activities
French investigating magistrate Jean-Louis Bruguière was also pursuing a case against the current President, Paul Kagame, and other members of his administration, for the assassination of his predecessor. This case was under the regular jurisdiction of the French courts because French citizens were also killed in the plane crash. The majority of genocide cases were handled by the so-called gacaca courts, a modernized customary dispute resolution mechanism.

Indictees 

The ICTR indicted a total of 96 individuals. One individual remains at large as a fugitive and if captured will be tried before the International Residual Mechanism for Criminal Tribunals (the IRMCT). One individual is on trial before the IRMCT. The ICTR (or the IRMCT as its successor) convicted 61 individuals: 28 of whom are currently serving sentences, 22 of whom have completed their sentences, and 11 of whom died while serving their sentences. The Tribunal acquitted 14 individuals and transferred the cases against 10 individuals to national jurisdictions. Proceedings against nine individuals ended before a final judgment was rendered: two of whom had their charges dismissed by the Tribunal, two of whom had their charges withdrawn by the Prosecutor, and five of whom died.

See also 
 Anees Ahmed
 Command responsibility
 Genocide Convention
 International Criminal Court
 Joint criminal enterprise
 Rule of Law in Armed Conflicts Project (RULAC)
 The Church and the Rwandan genocide
 Lyal S. Sunga
 Global Justice or Global Revenge? by Hans Köchler
 Yvonne Ntacyobatabara Basebya

Notes

References

Further reading

External links 
 International Center for Transitional Justice, Criminal Justice page
TRIAL: Cases before ICTR
 Human Rights Watch Report, "Genocide in Rwanda"
 Topical digests of the case law of ICTR and ICTY, Human Rights Watch, 2004
 A case before the ICTR: Jean Kambanda - TRIAL WATCH
 Hirondelle News Agency, Arusha (English + French + Kinyarwanda + Swahili) covering the ICTR trials
 Voices of the Rwanda Tribunal - collection of interviews with tribunal members
 Introductory note by Michael P. Scharf and procedural history note on the Statute of the International Criminal Tribunal for Rwanda in the United Nations Audiovisual Library of International Law

External links

 
Arusha
955
Organizations established in 1994
Rwandan genocide
1994 establishments in Tanzania
Organizations disestablished in 2015
United Nations courts and tribunals
Incitement to genocide case law